Amandla Stenberg (born October 23, 1998) is an American actress. She was included in Times list of Most Influential Teens in both 2015 and 2016, and has received several accolades, including a Teen Choice Award, an NAACP Image Award, and nominations for four Black Reel Awards and a Critics' Choice Award.

Stenberg made her acting debut with the film Colombiana (2011), and had her breakthrough playing Rue in the film The Hunger Games (2012), for which she won the Teen Choice Award for Best Chemistry. She had the recurring role of Macey Irving in the series Sleepy Hollow (2013–2014), voiced Bia in Rio 2 (2014) and starred as Halle Foster in the sitcom Mr. Robinson (2015). She garnered acclaim for her portrayals of Maddy Whittier in Everything, Everything (2017) and Starr Carter in the film The Hate U Give (2018), the latter of which won her the NAACP Image Award for Outstanding Actress in a Motion Picture and earned her a nomination for the Critics' Choice Award for Best Young Actor/Actress. Stenberg also starred as Ruby in The Darkest Minds (2018), Leyna in Where Hands Touch (2018), Julie in the Netflix miniseries The Eddy (2020) and Alana Beck in Dear Evan Hansen (2021).

Stenberg has been recognized for her outspoken views, particularly towards her activism for LGBT youth, which has received significant media coverage. In 2015, she made her musical debut as part of the folk-rock duo Honeywater. Her single, "Let My Baby Stay" was featured in her film Everything, Everything.

Early life
Amandla Stenberg was born in Los Angeles, California, the child of Karen Brailsford, an African-American spiritual counselor and writer, and Tom Stenberg, who is Danish. Her paternal grandmother had Greenlandic Inuit ancestry. Stenberg has two older half-sisters on her father's side. 

Her first name means "power" or "strength" in the South African languages of IsiXhosa and Zulu. At age four, Stenberg started doing catalog modeling shoots for Disney. She has appeared in commercials for clients such as Boeing.

Career

2011–2016: Early roles and breakthrough 
In 2011, she appeared in her first feature film, Colombiana, as a younger version of Zoe Saldana's character. Her breakthrough came at the age of 14, when she was cast as Rue in the 2012 film The Hunger Games. The film was a critical and financial success, and Stenberg's performance was praised. She received a number of awards and nominations, including a Black Reel Award nomination. In 2013, she was cast in the short film Mercy playing the daughter of Robin Thicke and Paula Patton; Thicke directed the film. Stenberg had a recurring role on season one of Sleepy Hollow from 2013 to 2014.

In 2013, Stenberg began performing on the violin and singing harmonies at Los Angeles venues with singer-songwriter Zander Hawley. In 2014, Stenberg voiced Bia in the animated film Rio 2, which was a commercial success. In 2015, Stenberg released her first EP in August 2015 as the folk-rock duo Honeywater. In 2015, she released the video "Don't Cash Crop My Cornrows". She played series regular Halle Foster on the short-lived series Mr. Robinson, which ran in 2015. Stenberg co-wrote the comic book Niobe: She is Life with Sebastian Jones, which was illustrated by Ashley A. Woods, and published in November 2015. It is the first nationally distributed comic that has a black woman as its protagonist, author, and another as the artist.

In 2016, Stenberg appeared in Beyoncé: Lemonade by Beyoncé, and won the BET YoungStars Award. In the same year, she signed with The Society, a modelling agency. Also in 2016, Stenberg had auditioned for the role of Shuri in the superhero film Black Panther, however, she walked away because she felt that she was not right for the role. She told Variety magazine in 2018: "It was so exhilarating to see it fulfilled by people who should have been a part of it and who deserved it and who were right for it. I just wasn't." The role was instead given to actress Letitia Wright.

2017–present: Critical acclaim 

In 2017, Stenberg and Sebastian Jones released Niobe: She is Death, the second part of the trilogy. In the same year, she starred in the romantic drama Everything, Everything, directed by Stella Meghie, and co-starring Nick Robinson. Her single, "Let My Baby Stay", was featured in the film's soundtrack. She received praise for her performance, and earned a Teen Choice Award nomination.

In 2018, she played the lead role of Starr Carter in the contemporary drama The Hate U Give, based on the novel of the same name, which is about the Black Lives Matter movement. The film was received positively, and Stenberg received critical acclaim for her performance, with the magazine Rolling Stone writing "It is impossible to over-praise Stenberg's incandescent performance, a gathering storm that grows in ferocity and feeling with each scene." The film's director, George Tillman Jr. wrote that "She has this ability to make you feel like you're seeing the real deal, which comes from a level of dedication to the material that's rare at any age." She earned several awards and nominations for the role, which include winning an NAACP Image Award and being nominated for a Critics' Choice Award. In late 2018, Stenberg starred in Amma Asante's World War II drama Where Hands Touch.

In 2019, Stenberg portrayed Elizabeth Eckford, a 15-year-old girl who in 1957 was among a group of nine black students who were initially prevented from entering a racially segregated high school in Little Rock, during a segment on the television show Drunk History (2019). In May 2019, she joined the cast of the Netflix miniseries The Eddy, which was released on May 8, 2020. That same month, she signed on to star in the remake of the 1996 thriller film Fear. In August 2020, she was cast as Alana Beck in Stephen Chbosky's film adaptation of the broadway musical Dear Evan Hansen. She also collaborated with the show's composers, Pasek and Paul, on "The Anonymous Ones," a new song written specifically for her character, whose role was expanded upon from the stage version. In 2021, Stenberg was cast in the main role for the upcoming Star Wars series The Acolyte.

Personal life
In 2016, Stenberg announced via Instagram that she would be studying filmmaking at New York University Tisch School of the Arts. She ultimately decided against attending the school, as she found herself booking jobs, and instead chose to continue with her acting career.

In January 2016, Stenberg came out as bisexual though she subsequently stated that pansexual was an accurate term as well. That March, Stenberg came out as non-binary, and uses both she/her and they/them pronouns. In June 2018, in an interview with Wonderland magazine, she came out as gay.

From early 2018 to late 2018, Stenberg dated singer Mikaela Mullaney Straus, better known by her stage name King Princess. In a July 2017 interview, Stenberg said she had stopped using a smartphone, believing that such devices and social media can have a negative effect on mental health. In 2020, she spent three months living in Copenhagen in order to qualify for Danish citizenship.

Dazed magazine named Stenberg "one of the most incendiary voices of her generation" when it featured her on its Autumn 2015 cover. She was included in Times list of Most Influential Teens in 2015 and again in 2016. In 2016, she was included in the SuperSoul 100 list of visionaries and influential leaders by Oprah Winfrey.

Stenberg is an intersectional feminist. She is outspoken about her political views in interviews and on social media and was named "Feminist of the Year" in 2015 by the Ms. Foundation for Women. She has spoken publicly on social media about cultural appropriation. Her video "Don't Cash Crop My Cornrows" admonished Kylie Jenner for adopting that traditionally African-American hairstyle. In April 2016, Stenberg gave a speech at WE Day California, a WE Charity event.

Filmography

Film

Television

Music videos

Awards and nominations 
Stenberg's accolades include an NAACP Image Award, a Teen Choice Award, and nominations for four Black Reel Awards and a Critics' Choice Award. She has also won awards for her activism.

References

External links

 
 

1998 births
21st-century American actresses
Actresses from Los Angeles
African-American actresses
African-American female models
American female models
African-American models
African-American feminists
American child actresses
American child models
American film actresses
American people of Danish descent
American people of Greenlandic descent
American people of Inuit descent
American television actresses
American non-binary actors
American lesbian actresses
Lesbian feminists
Living people
Intersectional feminism
LGBT African Americans
LGBT people from California